The 2019 Muscogee (Creek) general elections took place on November 2, 2019, to elect the Principal Chief, Second Chief, and half of the 16 National Council seats. The primary election was held on September 21 and in races where no one candidate won a majority of the votes, the top candidates moved on to the November general election. Muscogee (Creek) National general elections are held on the Saturday immediately following the first Friday of November every four years. Enrolled citizens, 18 years of age and above are eligible to register to vote in the elections. Incumbent Principal Chief James R. Floyd announced in June 2019 that he would not seek re-election and Second Chief Louis Hicks was unable to seek re-election due to term limits.

Because of irregularities, the primary election results were nullified and November 2 became the new primary election date with general election runoffs, when necessary, being held on December 14, 2019. National Council Second Speaker David Hill was the top vote-getter in the November primary and was elected principal chief in the December general election runoff; National Council Representative Del Beaver was elected second chief outright in the November primary. Hill and Beaver had both received the most votes in the nullified September primary.

Candidate Eligibility 

Employees of Muscogee (Creek) nation that file for candidacy must file for a leave of absence from their employment from the day they file for candidacy until the day after the elections.

Candidates

Principal Chief

Second Chief

National Council 

Source:

Primary Elections 
On September 21, the primary elections took place with nearly 5,000 voters. On September 28, the election board announced the official results. On October 2, the MCN Supreme Court nullified the results of the MCN Primary Election following receipt of petitions alleging fraud, irregularities, and recount of absentee ballots. The MCN election board announced November 2 as the new primary election date. The November 2 election resulted in no changes in the winner of each race. In the Tulsa District Seat A race, Cynthia Tiger and Jerry Wilson withdrew after the Sept. 21 primary, leaving the incumbent, Robert Hufft as the winner of that race. In the Okfuskee and McIntosh races, the winning candidate received a super majority and avoided the need to participate in the general elections. Del Beaver defeated Adam Jones III 3,480 votes to 1,535 which meant that the second chief election would not be held during the general election.

September 21 Nullified Results

November 2 Primary Results

General Election 
On December 14, the general election was held and three days later on December 17, 2019 the unofficial final election results were released showing David Hill as the front runner for the Principal Chief race. The results became official on December 20 and on January 1, 2020 winning candidates were sworn in to their position at the MCN Council House in Okmulgee, Oklahoma. On January 4, 2020 an inauguration ceremony was held at the River Spirit Casino Resort to commemorate the election of new Executive Branch leaders.

General Election Results

References

External links 

Election Code
Campaign Finance Code
Voting Precincts
September 28 primary results

Muscogee (Creek) Nation elections
Muscogee (Creek)
November 2019 events in the United States